Qian Weiping (born 1963) is a Chinese military scientist and a former major general in the People's Liberation Army (PLA). In July 2019, he was placed under investigation by the PLA's anti-corruption agency.

Education
Qian was born in the town of Yicheng, Yixing, Jiangsu in 1963. He graduated from National University of Defense Technology.

Career
In March 2016, he became the head of Information System Bureau of Equipment Development Department of the Central Military Commission. In April 2019, he was appointed deputy director of Equipment Development Department of the Central Military Commission, which oversaw the design of the space programme's telemetry, tracking and command systems for China's manned space program and the Chang'e 1 and Chang'e 2 lunar exploration programs.

Investigation
In July 2019, he was placed under investigation by the PLA's anti-corruption agency.

References

1963 births
People from Yixing
National University of Defense Technology alumni
Living people
People's Liberation Army generals from Jiangsu
Engineers from Jiangsu
Scientists from Wuxi